Ben Wade (1922–2002) was a Major League Baseball baseball player and scout.

Ben or Benjamin Wade may refer to:
Ben Wade, character in the film 3:10 to Yuma
Ben Wade, character in the film Key Largo
Ben Wade (politician) (1883–1958), Australian politician
Benjamin Wade (1800–1878), U.S. lawyer and United States senator
Benjamin Wade (Survivor contestant) (born 1971), American reality television personality

See also
Ben Wade Township, Pope County, Minnesota